The Indian Fighter is a 1955 American CinemaScope and Technicolor Western film directed by Andre de Toth and based upon an original story by Robert L. Richards. The film was the first of star Kirk Douglas's Bryna Productions that was released through United Artists. The film co-stars Elsa Martinelli, Walter Matthau, Kirk Douglas's ex-wife Diana Douglas and Walter Abel.

Plot
Johnny Hawks is a man who made his name fighting Indians. Returning to the West after the Civil War, he must now keep wronged Sioux warriors from attacking the Oregon-bound wagon train that he is leading and the nearby fort. Tensions between the two communities are building, with Indians trading gold to the whites for whiskey, and the white men trying to find the source of the Indians' "yellow iron."

Todd and Chivington, two unscrupulous white men engaged in trading whiskey for gold, shoot and kill a member of Chief Red Cloud's Lakota tribe when he refuses to tell them where the gold is. Chivington escapes, but Todd is captured. Hawks, visiting Red Cloud, fights Red Cloud's brother Gray Wolf for Todd's life and defeats him. He takes the ambitious gold-hunter back to the local fort commanded by Captain Trask, inviting the Chief to come to the fort to sign a peace treaty and see that justice done for his dead tribesman. 

After the treaty is signed, Hawks leads the wagon train west (including Todd and Chivington, whom Trask wants out of the area before they can make more trouble), taking it out of the way so he can see Red Cloud's daughter Onahti, with whom he is in love. Some of the tribesmen come to the train to trade game and handicrafts for manufactured goods. Chivington and Todd get a brave of weak character drunk enough to tell them where the gold comes from, despite the "oath of death" that Red Cloud required of every adult in the tribe not to reveal the location. Gray Wolf comes upon the drunken party, realizes what has happened, and is stabbed to death by Todd though he lives long enough to give a war cry, setting off a war between the white settlers, the U.S. Cavalry at the fort, and Red Cloud's band. When Johnny Hawks, en route back to the train, is attacked by Red Cloud's braves he realizes what has happened. The wagon train hightails it back to the fort, losing a few wagons along the way. The emigrants tell Captain Trask their version of what happened. When Hawks rides in on an Indian pony after having his own horse killed under him the emigrants try to lynch him, only being stopped by Trask firing a volley over their heads.

Besieged in the fort by a superior force, the soldiers, the pioneers, and Hawks fight off a day-long attack by Sioux warriors making good use of fire arrows and fireballs catapulted over the curtain wall by flexible stripped saplings. In the evening, after the Indians cease hostilities for the night Hawks goes to Captain Trask and asks permission to go over the wall, make his way to Red Cloud's camp, and attempt to restore the peace by turning Gray Wolf's killers over to him. Trask refuses permission, but Hawks goes anyway amidst a rain of bullets from the fort.

Getting to the camp, Hawks seeks out Onahti and persuades her to take him to the source of the Sioux gold. There, he finds Todd and Chivington preparing to blast the vein of exposed gold and takes them into custody. An attempt by Todd to escape results in Chivington's death, and Onahti knocks out Todd when he tries to bolt past her. Onahti and Hawks take Todd back to Red Cloud so justice might be done. When Todd runs for his life, he is shot and killed by a fire arrow.

Hawks and Red Cloud discuss the war the chief is considering, one Johnny warns Red Cloud will end with the extermination of all the Indians. The telling argument comes when Hawks asks the wise chieftain on which side his and Onahti's son would fight. Onahti confirms her love for Johnny, and her father sees the wisdom of not fighting. The next day, the tribe rides to within sight of the fort, then turns away without attacking. The war has been headed off. 

In the final scene, the surviving pioneer wagons roll along the river that runs past Red Cloud's encampment. Johnny Hawks and Onahti, skinny-dipping in the river, watch them pass on their way to the new lands in Oregon.

Cast

Kirk Douglas as Johnny Hawks
Elsa Martinelli as Onahti
Walter Matthau as Wes Todd
Diana Douglas as Susan Rogers
Walter Abel as Captain Trask
Lon Chaney as Chivington
Eduard Franz as Red Cloud
Alan Hale as Will Crabtree
Elisha Cook as Briggs
Ray Teal as Morgan
Prashant Mishra as Trader Joe
Michael Winkelman as Tommy Rogers
William Phipps as Lt. Blake
Harry Landers as Grey Wolf
Hank Worden as Crazy Bear
Uncredited
Lane Chandler as head settler

Production
The film was shot in Bend, Oregon. The end credits state, "Filmed in Oregon with the cooperation of the Bend Chamber of Commerce and the U.S. National Forestry Service."

Comic book adaptation
 Dell Four Color #687 (March 1956)

References

External links

1955 films
1955 Western (genre) films
Films scored by Franz Waxman
Films directed by Andre DeToth
American Western (genre) films
United Artists films
CinemaScope films
Films with screenplays by Ben Hecht
Bryna Productions films
Films adapted into comics
Films shot in Bend, Oregon
1950s English-language films
1950s American films